The Portable Modular Data Center (PMDC) is a portable data center solution built into a 20, 40, or 53-foot intermodal container (shipping container). It can be stored easily and then deployed when needed to augment traditional data centers or provide backup functionality in the event of a disaster.

A PMDC provides network connections in disaster areas when traditional power and connectivity resources have been impacted. Generally, PMDCs come with modules for power generation (diesel generator), Servers, and other computing resources. There are cooling units to control the massive amounts of heat that high-density computing resources generate, and internet connectivity resources (often satellite uplinks).

Portability
The Portable Modular Data Center is either fully or partially loaded with computer equipment can be transported using standard shipping methods. The PMDC is weather-resistant and insulated and can be placed in environments like the tundra or the desert.

See also
Shipping container architecture

References

External links

 IBM Portable Modular Data Center Homepage

IBM server computers
Intermodal containers
Data centers
Modular datacenter